April is the third studio album by American folk rock band Sun Kil Moon, released in the US on April 1, 2008 through Caldo Verde Records, and on April 18, 2008 in Japan via P-Vine Records. The album was recorded at Hyde Street Studios in San Francisco and Well Recording in Seattle during a seven-month stretch from spring to late summer in 2007. The album was produced and written by Mark Kozelek. Will Oldham, Ben Gibbard and Eric Pollard lend their backing vocals throughout the album. The album also comes with a bonus disc of 4 alternate recordings.

April is also available on vinyl through Caldo Verde Records, Vinyl Films, and Aural Exploits. A limited pressing of 1,000 copies on black vinyl were released on May 6, 2008 to retail and online outlets; 500 on white vinyl from May 20, 2008 exclusively at sunkilmoon.com; and 400 on marble vinyl, exclusive to Aural Exploits, from June 3, 2008. The 4 bonus tracks (plus two previously unreleased live versions of "Lucky Man" and "Tonight in Bilbao") were released separately as a vinyl EP, titled Tonight the Sky, available exclusively on Caldo Verde Records' website in January 2009.

The songs "Moorestown" and "Unlit Hallway" first appeared on Mark Kozelek's 2006 live double album Little Drummer Boy Live. At the time of the album's release, the two songs were previously unreleased. The song "Lucky Man" refers to the Emerson, Lake & Palmer song of the same name from the band's 1970 debut self-titled album. "Heron Blue" is featured in the Gears of War 3 teaser trailer which premiered in April 2010.

April debuted in the Billboard Top 200 at #127. By its second week, the album slid but remained in the top 200 at #200. The album was released to positive reviews, with Slant Magazine asking the question: "How many other artists can boast as many near-masterpieces?"

Track listing
All tracks written by Mark Kozelek.

Bonus disc
 "Tonight in Bilbao" (alternate version) – 9:43
 "The Light" (alternate version) – 6:02
 "Like the River" (alternate version) – 3:03
 "Tonight the Sky" (alternate version) – 7:36

Tonight the Sky (EP)
The bonus disc was released as a separate 12" vinyl EP in January 2009 by Caldo Verde Records and Vinyl Films. The vinyl release also features two previously unreleased live tracks.

Side A
 "Tonight in Bilbao" (alternate version) – 9:43
 "The Light" (alternate version) – 6:02
 "Like the River" (alternate version) – 3:03

Side B
 "Tonight the Sky" (alternate version) – 7:36
 "Tonight in Bilbao" (live in Barcelona) – 9:04
 "Lucky Man" (live in Glasgow) – 5:34

Personnel

Sun Kil Moon
 Mark Kozelek – vocals, guitar
 Anthony Koutsos – drums
 Geoff Stanfield – bass guitar

Additional musicians
 Michi Aceret – viola
 David Revelli – percussion
 Will Oldham – additional vocals
 Ben Gibbard – additional vocals
 Eric Pollard – additional vocals

Recording personnel
 Mark Kozelek – producer
 Aaron Prellwitz – engineer
 Geoff Stanfield – engineer
 Jason McGerr – engineer
 Steve Armstrong – additional engineering
 HT Waterman – additional engineering
 John Golden – mastering

Artwork
 Nyree Watts – photographs
 David Rager – design

References

External links
 Sad Reminders – Mark Kozelek fansite

2008 albums
Sun Kil Moon albums
Caldo Verde Records albums
P-Vine Records albums
Albums produced by Mark Kozelek